This is a list of University of Western Australia people, including its notable alumni and staff:

Notable alumni

Politics

Business

Public service and community

Law

Science, medicine, engineering and mathematics

Arts, literature and religion

Sport and entertainment

Music
 Mili Davies, classical guitarist
 Sara Macliver, soprano
 Tim Minchin, pianist and comedian
 Roger Smalley, pianist and composer
 Rory Garton-Smith, record producer

Notable administrators
 George Alexander Currie, second Vice Chancellor (1941-1952)

Chancellors
The Chancellor of The University of Western Australia is its most senior officer:

Notable faculty
Notable past and present members of faculty include:
 Christopher Chantler, physicist
 David Indermaur, psychologist
 James R. Lawler, foundation professor of French Studies
 Jill Milroy, Dean and Winthrop Professor at the University of Western Australia School of Indigenous Studies 
 Eric Saint, foundation professor of the Medical School

References

Western Australia, University of
 
 
University of Western Australia people